Densmore is an unincorporated community in Norton County, Kansas, United States, approximately two miles east of the city of Edmond near K-9 highway.

History
Densmore was a station on the Missouri Pacific Railroad.

Densmore had a post office from 1880 until 1992.

Education
Densmore is served by Logan USD 326 public school district.

Densmore High School was closed in 1965 through school unification. The Densmore High School mascot was Warriors.

Notable people
Glenn L. Archer Jr., a judge of the United States Court of Appeals for the Federal Circuit, was born here.

References

Further reading

External links
 Norton County maps: Current, Historic, KDOT

Unincorporated communities in Kansas
Unincorporated communities in Norton County, Kansas